Pilsen Plaza (Czech: Plzeň Plaza) is a  shopping mall and entertainment center in Plzeň, Czech Republic.

History
The facility was built by Israeli mall developer Plaza Centers. It opened on 5 December 2007, on the former land of Ex Plzeň, gastronomical exhibitions located just  from the central Náměstí Republiky.

Features
Since 2008, it has hosted a 1,720-seat, ten-screen multiplex cinema operated by Cinema City Czech Republic.

See also

 List of shopping malls in the Czech Republic

References

External links
 plazaplzen.eu, facility's official website
 Web page of Plzeň Plaza at the Plaza Centers server
 PDF file describing the project 
 Slideshow with 54 images

2007 establishments in the Czech Republic
Buildings and structures in Plzeň
Shopping malls established in 2007
Shopping malls in the Czech Republic
Tourist attractions in the Plzeň Region
21st-century architecture in the Czech Republic